Rhabdias is a genus of nematodes belonging to the family Rhabdiasidae. The genus has cosmopolitan distribution.

Species 

 Rhabdias aegyptiaca

 Rhabdias africanus
 Rhabdias alabialis
 Rhabdias ambystomae
 Rhabdias americanus
 Rhabdias androgyna
 Rhabdias australensis

References

Rhabditida
Rhabditida genera